Jermaine Warner (born 16 April 1971) is a former Bermudian cricketer. Warner's batting style is unknown.

Warner was selected as part of Bermuda's squad for the 2000 Americas Cricket Cup, but did not feature in any matches in the tournament. Later in October 2000, he made his debut for Bermuda in a List A match against the Leeward Islands in the 2000/01 Red Stripe Bowl, with him making two further List A appearances in that tournament against the Cayman Islands and  Guyana. He scored six runs in his three List A matches.

References

External links
Jermaine Warner at ESPNcricinfo
Jermaine Warner at CricketArchive

1971 births
Living people
Bermudian cricketers